Snettisham Carstone Quarry is an  biological Site of Special Scientific Interest north of King's Lynn in Norfolk. It is in the Norfolk Coast Area of Outstanding Natural Beauty.

This is the only known location in Britain for the micro-moth Nothris verbascella. Its host plant, hoary mullein, is abundant in areas of the quarry which are no longer worked.

There is no public access to this working quarry.

References

Sites of Special Scientific Interest in Norfolk